Dionicio Rodríguez (1891–1955) was a Mexican-born artist and architect whose work can be seen in Alabama, Arkansas, Illinois, Maryland, Michigan, New Mexico, Tennessee, and Texas, as well as Washington, D.C. and Mexico City.

His work is noted for its unique style of concrete construction that imitates wood, known as Faux Bois (French for false wood).  Gates, benches and artificial rock formations were created by the artist to invite visitors to rest or explore the landscape.

Many of his major works of art are listed in the National Register of Historic Places.

Biography
Rodríguez was born on April 11, 1891 in Toluca, State of Mexico, in Mexico to Catarino Rodríguez and Luz Alegria de Rodríguez. His family moved to Mexico City when he was young. When he was older, he worked with his father and brother as a bricklayer. At one time he worked with Pedro Ximénez, whose wife, Beatrice, would go on to become a cement sculptor of note herself.

Rodríguez left Mexico City in the early 1920s for Monterrey. He moved on to Laredo, Texas and then to San Antonio, arriving in about 1924.

Rodríguez died in San Antonio on December 16, 1955, and was buried in San Fernando Archdiocesan Cemetery. He had no immediate survivors.

Works

San Antonio

For the Japanese Tea Gardens in San Antonio, Rodríguez replicated a Japanese Torii gate at the entrance to the gardens.  This piece was added to the National Register of Historic Places in 2005

With the rise of anti-Japanese sentiment of World War II in the 1940s, the gardens were renamed the Chinese Tea Gardens. In 1984, the city restored the original "Japanese Tea Garden" designation in a ceremony.

At least eight of his other sculptures in San Antonio: the Buckeye Park Gate; the Bridge in Brackenridge Park; the Fence at Alamo Cement Company; the Fountain at Alamo Cement Company; the Jacala Restaurant; locations in Miraflores Park; the Stations of the Cross and Grotto at the Shrine of St. Anthony de Padua; the Trolley Stop in Alamo Heights, were also added to the National Register of Historic Places in 2004 and 2005

Memorial Park Cemetery

In 1935 Rodríguez was hired to beautify the Memorial Park Cemetery, Memphis, Tennessee with sculptures. Annie Laurie Wishing Chair, Broken Tree Bench, Abrahams Oak, Pool of Hebron and Cave of Machpelah are some of the most important sculptures that can be found throughout the cemetery.

Cedar Hill Cemetery

Working in Cedar Hill Cemetery just outside Washington, D.C. in suburban Suitland, Maryland in 1936 and 1937, Rodríguez built numerous sculptural pieces, including a fallen tree bench, a tiled block bench, two bridges with branch railings and log decks, a tree shelter, and an Annie Laurie Wishing Chair.

Crystal Shrine Grotto
Construction of the Crystal Shrine Grotto began in 1938. The grotto is a 60-foot (18.3-meter) deep, hand-built cave in a hillside near the center of the cemetery, filled with five tons (4.5 metric tons) of quartz crystal, hence the name Crystal Shrine Grotto. The shrines in the grotto illustrate the stages of "Christ's Journey on the Earth from Birth to Resurrection". Rodríguez' sculptures and the Crystal Shrine Grotto in the Memorial Park Cemetery are listed in the National Register of Historic Places.

Woodlawn Garden of Memories
At least five of the sculptural pieces in the Woodlawn Garden of Memories in Houston are the work of Rodriguez circa 1940: the 25-foot (7.6-meter) tall cross and its surrounding four benches; a flower planter basket; a 60-foot (18.3-meter) long fallen tree bench; and an Annie Laurie Wishing Chair.

Other works
Aviary at the Houston Zoo, 1513 N. McGregor Houston, TX, NRHP-listed
Buckeye Park Gate, 1600 W. Wildwood San Antonio, TX, NRHP-listed
Chinese Sunken Garden Gate, Brackenridge Park, 400 N. St. Mary's St. San Antonio, TX, NRHP-listed
Couchwood, 601 Couchwood Rd., Shorewood Hills, AR, NRHP-listed
Crestview Park, Crestview and Cherry Hill Drives, North Little Rock, AR, NRHP-listed
Dionicio Rodriguez Bridge in Brackenridge Park, 400 N. St. Mary's St. San Antonio, TX, NRHP-listed
Eddingston Court, 3300 Proctor St. Port Arthur, TX, NRHP-listed
Elmwood Cemetery, 600 Martin Luther King Jr Dr, Birmingham, AL
Fence at Alamo Cement Company, 7300 Jones Maltsberger Rd. San Antonio, TX, NRHP-listed
Fountain at Alamo Cement Company, 7300 Jones Maltsberger Rd. San Antonio, TX, NRHP-listed
Gate, Fence and Hollow Tree Shelter Designed by Dionicio Rodriguez, 320 Oak St. Clayton, NM, NRHP-listed
Gazebo for Albert Steves, 105 FM 473, at east portion of property Comfort, TX, NRHP-listed
Gazebo for James Richard Marmion, 1214 County Rd. Sweeny, TX, NRHP-listed
Jacala Restaurant, 2702 N. St. Mary's St. San Antonio, TX, NRHP-listed
Lakewood Park, Address Restricted North Little Rock, AR, NRHP-listed
Little Switzerland, Address Restricted Shorewood Hills, AR, NRHP-listed
Miraflores Park (seven works), 1184 E Hildebrand Ave. San Antonio, TX, NRHP-listed
Palapa Table for James Richard Marmion, 1214 County Rd. Sweeny, TX, NRHP-listed
T. R. Pugh Memorial Park, 3800 Lakeshore Drive, North Little Rock, AR, NRHP-listed
Sculptures of Dionicio Rodriguez at Memorial Park Cemetery, 5668 Poplar Ave. Memphis, TN, NRHP-listed
Stations of the Cross and Grotto at the Shrine of St. Anthony de Padua (grotto and 14 stations), 100 Peter Baque Rd. San Antonio, TX, NRHP-listed
Trolley Stop in Alamo Heights, 4900 blk of Broadway Alamo Heights, TX, NRHP-listed
Woodlawn Garden of Memories Cemetery, 1101 Antoine Houston, TX, NRHP-listed

Further reading

See also

References

External links
 http://encyclopediaofarkansas.net/encyclopedia/entry-detail.aspx?entryID=503 EncyclopediaOfArkansas.net
 Capturing Nature: The Cement Sculpture of Dionicio Rodriguez, a book about Rodriguez's work
Studio Cortes, the professional website of Carlos Cortes, great-nephew of Dionicio Rodriguez, who is carrying on the family artistic tradition

Mexican sculptors
Male sculptors
Mexican architects
Concrete sculptures
1891 births
1955 deaths
People from Toluca
Mexican emigrants to the United States
20th-century sculptors